Felsen is a surname. Notable people with the surname include:

 Hans-Jürgen Felsen (born 1940), German former sprinter
 Henry Felsen (1916–1995), American writer
 Leopold B. Felsen (1924–2005), German-born American physicist
 Martin Felsen (born 1968), American architect
 Vivian Felsen, Canadian translator and artist

See also
 Felson, another surname